Yield to the Night (also titled Blonde Sinner in the US) is a 1956 British crime drama film directed by J. Lee Thompson and starring Diana Dors. The film is based on the 1954 novel of the same name by Joan Henry.  The storyline bears a superficial and coincidental resemblance to the Ruth Ellis case, which had occurred the previous year but subsequent to the release of Henry's novel.  The film received much positive critical attention, particularly for the unexpectedly skilled acting of Dors, who had previously been cast solely as a British version of the typical "blonde bombshell". The movie was nominated for the Palme d'Or at the 1956 Cannes Film Festival.

Premise
Mary Hilton (Diana Dors) has been convicted of murder and sentenced to hang, and she spends her last weeks in the condemned cell in a British women's prison.  While there she remembers the events in her life leading up to the murder.

Cast

 Diana Dors as Mary Hilton
 Yvonne Mitchell as Matron Hilda MacFarlane
 Michael Craig as Jim Lancaster
 Marie Ney as Prison Governess
 Geoffrey Keen as Prison Chaplain
 Liam Redmond as Prison Doctor
 Olga Lindo as Senior Matron Hill
 Joan Miller as  Matron Barker
 Marjorie Rhodes as Matron Brandon
 Molly Urquhart as Matron Mason
 Mary Mackenzie as Matron Maxwell 
 Harry Locke as Fred Hilton
 Michael Ripper as Roy, bar good-timer
 Joyce Blair as Doris, storeclerk-friend
 Charles Clay as Bob
 Athene Seyler as Miss Bligh
 Mona Washbourne as Mrs. Thomas, landlady
 Alec Finter as Mr. Thomas, landlord 
 Mercia Shaw as Lucy
 Marianne Stone as New Matron Richardson
 Charles Lloyd-Pack as Mary's Lawyer
 Dandy Nichols as Mrs. Price
 John Charlesworth as Alan Price

Production
The film was based on a book by Joan Henry, a writer and former debutante who had gone to prison. Henry wrote a memoir about her experiences which was filmed as The Weak and the Wicked, directed by J. Lee Thompson and starring Diana Dors. Thompson married Henry and they decided to collaborate on another movie. Thompson was anti-capital punishment and wanted to do a story about a man in a death cell. Henry said she could not write about a man but might be able to do it about a woman. "So he really gave me the idea, and then I showed him a plan", she said. The novel of Yield to the Night was published in 1954.

The storyline bore some similarities to the Ruth Ellis case but Henry wrote the story and script during the filming of The Weak and the Wicked. Dors (who had been briefly acquainted with Ellis on the film Lady Godiva Rides Again in 1951) said it "wasn’t about Ruth Ellis at all. Everybody thinks it was but the script was written two years before Ruth Ellis committed the murder. It's a fascinating syndrome that all this was put down on paper before it happened."

Thompson later said "For capital punishment you must take somebody who deserves to die, and then feel sorry for them and say this is wrong. We did that in Yield to the Night: we made it a ruthless, premeditated murder."

Dors said this "was the first time I ever had a chance to play such a part. I was very thankful to Lee J. Thompson for having faith in me. Until then everybody thought I was just a joke, and certainly not an actress to be taken seriously, even though I knew within myself I was capable of playing other roles. The big problem was trying to convince other people."

Filming started at Elstree Studios on 2 November 1955.

Michael Craig said Thompson was "a small, very intense man with a violent temper, which could be provoked by practically anything or nothing. He had a nervous habit of tearing sheets of paper into long thin strips." Craig thought Dors was "terrific... one of the most free-spirited and professional actresses I worked with."

Reception
Variety called it "a grim form of entertainment."

Filmink called it "a masterpiece, a stunningly good drama, where Dors plays a character who never asks for sympathy but gets it anyway: she's guilty of the crime, isn’t friendly to her family or death penalty protestors, still loves the louse who drove her to murder. The movie is full of little touches that speak volumes for Henry's personal experience in prison – the routine of changing guards, the conversations, the way the seconds drag on by, the visiting officials, the small privileges, the overwhelming pressure of the longing for a reprieve – and the final moments are devastating: it's one of the best British movies of the decade."

The movie was Britain's entry to the 1956 Cannes Film Festival.

A 19-year-old woman reportedly committed suicide within hours of watching the film.

Despite the film's success Dors never worked with Thompson again.

References

External links
 
 

Yield to the Night at Letterbox DVD
Yield to the Night at BFI Screenonline

1956 films
1956 crime drama films
British black-and-white films
British crime drama films
Films shot at Associated British Studios
Films based on British novels
Films about capital punishment
Films directed by J. Lee Thompson
Women in prison films
1950s prison films
1950s English-language films
1950s British films